Ovingham railway station is located on the Gawler line.

History
The station opened in the early 1880s.

It is one of the very few stations in the network with no dedicated passenger parking. The station is serviced by two tracks. The two side platforms are accessible by pedestrian crossings at either end. The standard gauge line behind the Gawler bound platform is only used for interstate passenger and freight services. The station has two tin style shelters the same as at Kilkenny and Dudley Park .

Grade separation
Funding for a grade separation of Torrens Road and the Gawler line was announced in the 2019/2020 state budget, with a combined contribution of $231 million from the Federal and State governments. The preferred design was revealed in June 2020 which would see an overpass built for Torrens Road to run over the Gawler line; the nearby intersection of Torrens and Churchill Roads would also be raised to meet the elevated height of Torrens Road. Major construction commenced in 2021 with anticipated completion in 2023. The station itself was partly demolished in March 2022 during construction works, and remained closed when the Gawler line reopened in June 2022. Ovingham station later reopened on 7 November 2022.

Services by platform

References

External links

Railway stations in Adelaide